Mohammed Ishaq "Mo" Chaudry (born 21 September 1960) is a British Pakistani businessman. He spent his early years in Pakistan, before travelling to England and building an estimated fortune of more than £100m, confirming himself as one of the most influential and successful businessmen in the country. Chaudry is notable for his time as chairman of WaterWorld aqua park, from 1999 to the present day, and for his M Club fitness centres. 

In 2018, he acquired a majority stake in Pulse Group, the leisure equipment and provision giant partnering more than 10,000 leisure facilities in 32 countries across 5 continents. He also appeared in the Channel 4 TV series Secret Millionaire and has made a number of other TV appearances. He was the manager of World's Strongest Man Eddie Hall and sponsors Paralympic medal-winning rower Ian Marsden.

Early life 
Mo Chaudry was born in the Rawalpindi District of Pakistan. He is the son of strongman and ex-soldier Iqbal Chaudry. At the age of 8 he moved, with his family, to Luton, England, where he attended Denbigh Junior and then Beech Hill High School.
Upon first moving to England, Chaudry could not speak a word of English (only Punjabi) and coped with negative attention by developing a combination of both fighting and communication skills. When his father began a mini-supermarket business, the family moved to a bigger home in Telford, Shropshire. Mo won a place at Wellington Grammar School and later attended New College, Telford, where he passed his O-levels and A-levels. Following this, he graduated with a degree in sports science from Madeley College of Physical Education, part of North Staffordshire Polytechnic.
After graduating, Chaudry started work in the financial services industry, firstly as an insurance canvasser for General Portfolio  and then setting up his own financial services business. He made his first million, as an independent financial adviser and property investor, by the age of 30.

Ventures

WaterWorld
In 1999, whilst seeking a potential business investment, Chaudry bought the failing WaterWorld aqua park from The Rank Group, for £1.5 million. Starting a major £10 million refurbishment, Chaudry quickly made WaterWorld a popular attraction. He managed to make a profit in the first year and has continued to do so every year since. The WaterWorld complex now receives over 400,000 visitors annually and is regarded as the most profitable water-based visitor attraction in the UK.

Chaudry has continued to expand and develop Waterworld and in 2018 announced plans for four new rides as well as  vast expansion of the site, housing an 18,000sqft golf facility as well as the relocated M Club premium gym. An outdoor ‘boot camp’ area with jogging and running tracks will also be created, while the site will be linked to the Trent and Mersey Canal, creating a new pedestrian access. The scheme will create 60 jobs and bring an extra 150,000 visitors to the attraction.

M Club Spa and Fitness
In May 2011, it was announced that Esporta Health Club in Festival Park, Stoke-on-Trent, would close; leaving 2,500 club members looking for an alternative and causing the loss of over 40 local jobs. As a member of Esporta for 12 years, Chaudry put in a successful takeover bid for his new venture – M Club Spa and Fitness. He reopened the club within two months.

Personal life
Whilst working as a bouncer at The Place nightclub in Staffordshire, Chaudry met his wife Ann. They got married on 5 March 1987 and have three daughters.) Chaudry and his wife currently live in the Staffordshire countryside.

In 2008, Chaudry became the only person to have received honorary degrees from both Staffordshire universities in the same year (namely Keele University and Staffordshire University).

Two years later, he was awarded the 'Star of Pakistan' (the highest civil award) at the Pakistani Achievement Awards, which recognises individuals of Pakistani origin for excellence and positive contributions to the image of Pakistan, and who act as best example of Britishness.
In recent years, Chaudry has become a campaigner against injustice, taking a stand against forced marriage and attempting to join the British National Party to highlight their racist constitution.

Charity work 
In 2015, Chaudry was part of a team which rowed 500 nautical miles from Tower Bridge in London to the Eiffel Tower in Paris to raise money for the Donna Louise hospice.
Chaudry is also founder of the M Club Foundation, set up to help local good causes and youngsters realise their dreams.  
To raise funds for the National Deaf Children's Society, he participated in a desert bike ride in the Middle East.
He has also been a fund-raiser for the National Society for the Prevention of Cruelty to Children. 
Chaudry founded and supports the Al Amir Foundation School in his home village in Pakistan – a middle school for around 200 children. Chaudry provided land for the school and financed its start-up.
Chaudry is an Ambassador for The Princes' Trust and on the speaking Bureau for Mosaic (one of Prince Charles' Charities). As part of Prince Charles's Seeing is Believing programme, in 2010, Chaudry toured Pakistan and visited areas affected by floods.

Secret Millionaire
Chaudry appeared in the second series of the UK television programme, Secret Millionaire, on Channel 4 (first broadcast on Wednesday 12 December 2007).
A reality television show; it documented Chaudry going incognito into the Harehills district of Leeds – home to the city's largest Asian and ethnic community – and donating £30,000 to good causes.

Step Up 
In conjunction with Mitchell Business and Enterprise College, Chaudry set up Step Up; a pilot mentoring project, designed to inspire community cohesion, raise aspirations and tackle unemployment. Step Up provided students with an opportunity to work at WaterWorld and other businesses in Stoke-on-Trent.

Sport 
Chaudry's natural sporting talents were put to the test at university, where he won a silver medal in weightlifting at the 1982 Student Olympics and bronze in 1983. An avid cricket player; while studying at New College, Telford, he won caps for Warwickshire County Cricket Club (under 19s). Later, as a player for Shifnall CC, Telford, he won full Shropshire CCC caps.

References

1960 births
Living people
People from Rawalpindi
People from Newcastle-under-Lyme
Pakistani emigrants to the United Kingdom
Naturalised citizens of the United Kingdom
British businesspeople
British businesspeople of Pakistani descent